Waynesville High School is a public high school in Waynesville, Ohio.  It is the only high school in the Wayne Local Schools district. Approximately 470 students are enrolled. The school colors are orange, black, and white.

Waynesville's athletic program was a charter member of the Fort Ancient Valley Conference from 1964 to 1977. After the FAVC, the school was in the Kenton Trace Conference. The school's sports teams, known as the Spartans, now participate in the Southwestern Buckeye League's Buckeye Division, which consists of smaller schools.

Basketball Records 
Waynesville High School's basketball team was ranked 345 in Ohio, 66th in Ohio Division 3, and 48th in Dayton as of 2023. The Lady Spartans Basketball Team won their 4th District Championships in a span of 5 years in 2022.

References

External links
District Website

High schools in Warren County, Ohio
Public high schools in Ohio